"Peaches" is a song recorded by South Korean singer Kai for his second extended play of the same name. It was released as the EP's lead single by SM Entertainment on November 30, 2021.

Background and release 
On October 26, 2021, SM Entertainment announced that Kai will release his second solo album in November 2021. On November 11, it was announced that Kai would release his second extended play Peaches on November 30, 2021. The song was released alongside the extended play and its music video on November 30.

Composition 
"Peaches" was composed by Wolfgvng, Zach Sorgen, Harold "Alawn" Philippon, Ryan S. Jhun and Yoo Young-jin, with the arrangement was held by Wolfgvng, Jhun and Alawn. The song features some sweet vibes, raising expectations as you can also meet hip-hop-based songs that remind you of Kai's powerful performance. The lyrics, which was written by Kim Anna of ARTiffect, talks about of "entreating the address to give in to his will, so to speak, and to remain as faithful to him as he is to her". The song was composed in the key of F# major, with a tempo of 134 beats per minute.

Music video 
The music video, which was directed by Kim Ki-hyun, was released alongside the song by SM Entertainment on November 30. Blending traditional and modern elements from various cultures, the music video paints Kai "as a celestial immortal from folktales, wandering an Eden-like paradise and plucking peaches from the trees around him", with some "smooth and graceful" choreography scenes.

Credits 
Credits adapted from EP's liner notes.

Studio 
 SM Starlight Studio – recording, engineered for mix, digital editing
 SM Lvyin Studio – recording
 SM Blue Cup Studio – mixing
 821 Sound Mastering – mastering

Personnel 

 SM Entertainment – executive producer
 Lee Soo-man – producer
 Lee Sung-soo – production director, executive supervisor
 Tak Young-jun – executive supervisor
 Kai – vocals, background vocals
 Kim Anna (ARTiffect) – lyrics
 Wolfgvng – composition, arrangement 
 Zach Sorgen – composition 
 Harold "Alawn" Philippon – composition, arrangement
 Ryan S. Jhun – composition, arrangement
 Yoo Young-jin – composition, music and sound supervisor
 Kim Yeon-seo – vocal directing
 Jeong Yu-ra – recording, engineered for mix, digital editing
 Lee Ji-hong – recording
 Jung Eui-seok – mixing
 Kwon Nam-woo – mastering

Release history

References 

2021 songs
2021 singles
Korean-language songs
SM Entertainment singles
Songs written by Ryan S. Jhun
Songs written by Yoo Young-jin